The Valentia Lifeboat Station is located at Knightstown, Valentia Island, County Kerry, Ireland.

The first lifeboat house in the area was constructed in 1864 on the mainland at Reenard Point, facing the island of Valentia. It closed in 1896, and was reopened in 1946. Between 1939 and 1945, an auxiliary rescue boat had been stationed at Valentia to help aircraft personnel flying in from the Atlantic during Second World War. A new boathouse was constructed in 1995, and the following year, the station received the John and Margaret Doig, a Severn-class lifeboat, becoming one of the 35 Royal National Lifeboat Institution (RNLI) stations around the British Isles to operate the RNLI's largest lifeboat.

In 1985, its personnel participated in the recovery of corpses from Air India Flight 182, the worst aviation disaster in Irish territory.

References

Bibliography
Robinson, Richard. Valentia Lifeboats: A History. History Press Limited, 2011.

External links
Valentia Lifeboat Station

Sea rescue
Lifeboat stations in Ireland